Klaudio Ndoja (born May 18, 1985) is an Albanian-Italian professional basketball player. He currently plays for Pallacanestro Forlì 2.015. He was a member of the Albania national team in 2012 for the EuroBasket 2013 qualifiers.

Achievements
Enel Brindisi
 Italian Legadue Cup (1): 2011–12
 Promotion to Serie A (1): 2011–12

References

External links
Legabasket Profile
Legadue Basket Profile

1985 births
Living people
Italian men's basketball players
Albanian men's basketball players
New Basket Brindisi players
Vanoli Cremona players
Basketball players from Shkodër
Power forwards (basketball)
Small forwards